Flame of Stamboul is a 1951 American thriller film directed by Ray Nazarro and starring Richard Denning, Lisa Ferraday and Norman Lloyd.

The film's sets were designed by the art director Cary Odell.

Synopsis
A gang of criminal plans to steal important details about the defence of the Suez Canal and sell them to enemy powers.

Main cast
 Richard Denning as Larry Wilson  
 Lisa Ferraday as Lynette Garay  
 Norman Lloyd as Louie Baracca  
 Nestor Paiva as Joe Octavian  
 George Zucco as The Voice  
 Donald Randolph as Hassan

References

Bibliography
 Wesley Alan Britton. Onscreen and Undercover: The Ultimate Book of Movie Espionage. Greenwood, 2006.

External links
 

1951 films
1950s thriller films
American thriller films
Columbia Pictures films
Films set in Istanbul
Films set in Egypt
American black-and-white films
1950s English-language films
Films directed by Ray Nazarro
1950s American films